Soulari may refer to the following places in Greece:

Soulari, Arcadia, a village in Arcadia 
Soullaroi, a village on the island Cephalonia